Hohe Pressing is a hill or summit in the Central Eastern Alps. It is 2370 m (7775 ft) high and is one of a subgroup of three peaks in region of the Gurktal Alps, Austria.

External links 
Hohe Pressing on SummitPost

Mountains of Carinthia (state)
Mountains of the Alps